"Jammin' Me" is a song by Tom Petty and the Heartbreakers, co-written by Bob Dylan, Tom Petty, and Mike Campbell. The heartland rock tune first appeared on the band's 1987 album Let Me Up (I've Had Enough), and was later included on Petty's 'best of' albums Playback and Anthology: Through the Years.

Background and lyrics
In a November 2003 interview with Songfacts, guitarist Mike Campbell explained the song's origins:

On the True Confessions tour between Petty and Dylan (who both later became members of the Traveling Wilburys), they collaborated on this track which became the opening song on the album. The song is about a man "overwhelmed by the volume of disconnected 'news' generated in the disinformation age" containing a "laundry list" of 1980s celebrities such as Eddie Murphy, Joe Piscopo, and Vanessa Redgrave, and "the apple in young Steve's eye" referring to Steve Jobs at Apple Inc., among others. It follows in line with an ongoing theme throughout the album of people "who are reeling from media assaults and shattered relationships", but have a strong desire to survive in order to make sense of the world. Some lyrics came from Dylan and Petty picking words out of a newspaper and off the television.

Petty later commented that "the verse about Eddie Murphy, that was all Bob [Dylan]. Which embarrassed me a little bit because I remember seeing Eddie Murphy on TV really pissed off about it. I had nothing against Eddie Murphy or Vanessa Redgrave. What [Dylan] was talking about was media overload and being slammed with so many things at once. And times were changing; there weren't four television channels anymore."

Release and reception
"Jammin' Me" was released as the first single from Let Me Up (I've Had Enough) in 1987, reaching No. 1 in the Billboard Album Rock Tracks chart, as well as No. 18 on the Billboard Hot 100. It became Petty's third single to hit No. 1 on the Album Rock (later known as Mainstream Rock) chart and stayed there for four weeks; previous songs to top this chart were "The Waiting" in 1981 and "You Got Lucky" in 1982. Critics were generally favorable towards the single with AllMusic comparing it to the Rolling Stones song "Start Me Up", saying "the fabulous groove is positively infectious". Rolling Stone complimented Petty and Campbell's "raw guitar chords" and Benmont Tench's "honky-tonk piano fills". Cash Box said it features a "]strong, earnest vocal and a gritty, guitar-based production."

The song became a standard in Petty's live sets with "astounding results", though it was not actually played as often as other songs which remained more popular. When "Jammin' Me" was performed during the Heartbreakers' impressive multi-performances at the Fillmore in 1997 and 1999, Petty played lead guitar, rather than Campbell. Despite the high chart position, the song failed to appear on the 1993 release Greatest Hits, but did appear on the compilations Playback and Anthology: Through the Years, as well as the posthumous collection The Best of Everything.

Personnel
Tom Petty - lead and backing vocals
Mike Campbell - lead and rhythm guitars, bass guitar, percussion
Benmont Tench - piano, organ
Stan Lynch - drums, percussion

Charts

References

1987 singles
Tom Petty songs
Songs written by Bob Dylan
Songs written by Tom Petty
Songs written by Mike Campbell (musician)
1987 songs